Thomas M. Stanley is an American state legislator serving in the Massachusetts House of Representatives. He is a Waltham resident and a member of the Democratic Party.

Stanley is the son the late William F. Stanley who served as Mayor of Waltham from 1985-1999.

See also
 Massachusetts House of Representatives' 9th Middlesex district
 2019–2020 Massachusetts legislature
 2021–2022 Massachusetts legislature

References

Living people
Democratic Party members of the Massachusetts House of Representatives
Politicians from Waltham, Massachusetts
21st-century American politicians
Year of birth missing (living people)